A kinase anchor protein 10, mitochondrial is an enzyme that in humans is encoded by the AKAP10 gene.

Function 

The A-kinase anchor proteins (AKAPs) are a group of structurally diverse proteins, which have the common function of binding to the regulatory subunit of protein kinase A (PKA) and confining the holoenzyme to discrete locations within the cell. This gene encodes a member of the AKAP family. The encoded protein interacts with both the type I and type II regulatory subunits of PKA; therefore, it is a dual-specific AKAP. This protein is highly enriched in mitochondria. It contains RGS (regulator of G protein signalling) domains, in addition to a PKA-RII subunit-binding domain. The mitochondrial localization and the presence of RGS domains may have important implications for the function of this protein in PKA and G protein signal transduction.

Interactions 

AKAP10 has been shown to interact with PDZK1 and PRKAR1A.

References

External links

Further reading 

 
 
 
 
 
 
 
 
 
 

A-kinase-anchoring proteins